The Special Investigation Service or STT is a law enforcement institution in Lithuania serving under the Seimas and the President of Lithuania to combat corruption. With departments in Kaunas, Klaipėda, Šiauliai and Panevėžys, its objectives are to identify and investigate cases of corruption as well as to prevent it through education and introduction of improved procedures in the public sector.

History

With growing awareness of corruption in 1990s and several scandals (most notable of them was linked to the Prime Minister Adolfas Šleževičius), the Homeland Union won 1996 Lithuanian parliamentary election. The newly formed Lithuanian government, led by Gediminas Vagnorius, decided in 1997 to establish a separate organization for addressing the problem. It was done by government's decree.

Main task of the STT was detection and detention of corrupt and abusive of power officials (civil servants, judges and so).

The STT was accordingly established and for its first several years was overseen by the Ministry of the Interior. In May 2000, it came under the direct oversight of the President and Seimas.

Since 2008, the STT started bills' review.

See also 
 Anti-corruption

References

External links
Official site

Government agencies established in 1997
Anti-corruption agencies
Specialist law enforcement agencies of Lithuania